Ona is a given name and a surname. Notable people with the name include:

Given name
 Aldona of Lithuania (c. 1309–1339), baptized Ona, Lithuanian princess and Polish queen consort
 Ona Baliukonė (1948–2007), Lithuanian poet and painter
 Ona Batlle (born 1999), Spanish football player
 Ona Carbonell (born 1990), Spanish synchronized swimmer
 Ona Danutė Buivydaitė (born 1947), Lithuanian artist and designer
 Ona Dodd (1886–1956), American baseball player
 Ona Dokalskaitė-Paškevičienė (1912–2007), Lithuanian-American painter
 Ona Galdikaitė (1898–1990), Lithuanian poet, nun and dissident
 Ona Grauer (born 1975), Mexican-Canadian actress
 Ona Judge Staines (1773–1848), American fugitive slave
 Ona Juknevičienė (born 1955), Lithuanian politician
 Ona Kreivytė-Naruševičienė (born 1935), Lithuanian ceramic artist
 Ona Mašiotienė, (1883–1949), Lithuanian writer, activist and educator
 Ona F. Meens (1886–1980), American educator
 Ona Meseguer (born 1988), Spanish water polo player
 Ona Munson (1903–1955), American actress in Gone with the Wind
 Ona Muraškaitė-Račiukaitienė (1896–?), Lithuanian educator and politician
 Ona Narbutienė (1930–2007), Lithuanian musicologist and educator
 Ona Šimaitė (1894–1970), Lithuanian librarian who used her position to aid and rescue Jews in the Vilna Ghetto
 Anna, Grand Duchess of Lithuania (1392–1418) or Ona Vytautienė,  first wife of Vytautas
 Ona Zee (born 1951), American pornographic actress and model

Surname
 Bryan Oña (born 1993), Ecuadorian football player
 Carl Ona-Embo (born 1989), French-Congolese basketball player
 Cynthia Ona Innis (born 1969), American artist
 Daniel Ona Ondo (born 1945), Gabonese politician
 Domingo de Oña (1560–1626), Spanish bishop
 Enrique Ona (born 1939), Filipino doctor and politician
 Francis Ona (c. 1953–2005), Papua New Guinea, Bougainville secessionist
 Íñigo of Oña (died 1057), Spanish priest
 Jorge Oña (born 1996), Cuban baseball player
 Marc Ona, Gabonese environmentalist
 Pedro de Oña (1570–1643), Chilean poet
 Kim On-a (born 1988), South Korean handball player